Helidon Gjergji (born 1970 in Shkodër, Albania) is a contemporary artist who works in various media.

Life

Helidon Gjergji was born in Shkodër and raised in Tirana, Albania, where he studied art and earned a BFA from the Academy of Arts in Tirana. After Albania's borders opened in 1991, he moved to Italy, where he studied visual arts further, obtained a degree from the Academy of Fine Arts in Naples, Italy, and travelled across Italy and Europe. In 1997, he moved to Chicago, where he earned an MFA in Art Theory and Practice from Northwestern University, Chicago, and had his first American exhibitions. He currently lives and works between New York City and Tirana.

Work and exhibitions 

Throughout his career, Gjergji has worked in a variety of mediums, from painting, to media installation, and to architecture.

Beyond his site-specific work for exhibition venues, Gjergji also produced monumental works of public art. For the Facades Project section of Tirana International Contemporary Art Biennial 4 (2009), he was invited to paint the façade of an oversized Stalinist building, which he overlaid with contemporary icons of the digital age. For the Project Biennial 3 in Konjic, Bosnia & Herzegovina (2015), which commissions artwork for the atomic bunker of the former Yugoslavia, he created for one of its rock-ribbed tunnel-like corridors a hall of mirrors in which the slogans of militaristic video games constantly appear. For Manifesta 8 (2010), he created an olfactory installation out of marketplace spices associated with the ethnic communities resident in Murcia (Spain).

Gjergji was also one of the three directors of Tirana Open, an international contemporary art festival of the visual arts, film, architecture, music, and literature. He has taught at the State University of New York, Parsons New School of Design, the School of the Art Institute of Chicago, Northwestern University, and Northeastern Illinois University.

See also 
Albanian art

Bibliography 

Cathryn Drake, 2018, “Cetinje, Montenegro: Helidon Gjergji, National Museum of Montenegro,” Artforum
Ian Bancroft, 2017, "Tito's Arc: Bosnian Nuclear Bunker Transformed into a Contemporary Art Space," The Independent.
Daria Sito-Sucic, 2015, "Bosnian Artists Plan Cold War Museum in Tito's Secret Bunker," Reuters.
Jessica De Korte, 2015, "Underground Art in Tito’s Bunker," The Irish Times.
Cathryn Drake, 2014, “Tirana, Albania: Helidon Gjergji, National Gallery of Arts,” Artforum
Santa Nastro, 2014, "Stalin? Lo becco su Facebook. Helidon Gjergji a Tirana," Artribune
Elsa Demo, 2014, Interview at the National Gallery of Albania, ABC News, Albania
Public Talk, 2014, "Building Communities Through Public Art," Teachers College, Columbia University
Julia Draganovic, 2011, Interview at Venice Biennale 54, Clocktower Radio
Marco Purpura, 2011, "Transmedia Memory of Albanian Migration in Italy: Helidon Gjergji's, Adrian Paci's, and Anri Sala's Moving-Image Installations," California Italian Studies Journal, UC Berkeley
Ana Vukadin, 2010, "New Residents of Murcia," Manifesta 8, Art in America.
Santa Nastro, 2010, "Da Manifesta: L’opera Piu Apprezzata Da Tutti? Non Si Vede...," Exibart 
Catalogue 2010, Venice Biennale of Architecture 12.
Francesca Picchi, 2010, "Beyond Color," Domus.
Diana Marrone, 2010, The Tirana Façades Project, CultFrame
Marie Liljedahl, 2010, Interview, Swedish Radio
Katie Donoghue, 2009, "Helidon Gjergji: Waves," Whitewall Magazine.
Amanda Browder, 2009, Interview, Bad at Sports
Amalia Piccinini, 2009, Flash Art
Valentina Sansone, 2008, "Silica," 'Flash Art.
Jessica Savoia, 2008, "Helidon Gjergji," Espoarte.
Nicola Bozzi, 2008, "Helidon Gjergji," Exibart.
Catalogue 2007, Venice Biennale of Art 52.
Carlo Simula, 2007, L’Uomo Vogue.
Chiara Canali, 2006, "Helidon Gjergji," Flash Art.
James Yood, 2006, "Helidon Gjergji," Contemporary Magazine.
Ivan Quaroni, 2004, "Helidon Gjergji," Flash Art.
Enrico Giacomelli, 2004, "Helidon Gjergji: Hawaii, Milano" Exibart.
Michele Robecchi, 2004, "Helidon Gjergji", Ciocca Arte Contemporanea, Milan, exhibition catalogue
Donatella Galasso, 2003, "Present Future," Teknemedia.
Pedro Velez, 2002, "Kaleidoscope," Sculpture Magazine.
Jon Anderson, 2001, "Park-in salutes cars many uses," Chicago Tribune
Michelle Grabner, 2001, "Helidon Gjergji at Temporary Services," New Art Examiner.
Giancarlo Politi, 2001, "La Biennale di Tirana 1," Flash Art.
Francesco Bonami, 2001, "Tirana Biennale 1", exhibition catalogue

External links 
Official website
Mousse Magazine
e-flux Projects
Artforum

People from Tirana
Living people
Albanian artists
People from Shkodër
1970 births